Jesus' teachings referring to little children (paidíon) and infants/babies appear in several places in the New Testament and in the non-canonical Gospel of Thomas.

New Testament
The King James Version of Matthew's gospel (chapter 18) relates that:

The word translated as converted in the King James Version (straphēte) literally means 'turn'. It is translated as "turn" in the English and American Standard Versions and as "change" in the New International Version. Elsewhere in the New Testament, the change of heart demanded by John the Baptist and by Jesus often uses the word metanoia. German theologian Heinrich Meyer suggests that Jesus' challenge to his disciples is to "turn round upon [the] road, and to acquire a moral disposition similar to the nature of little children".

The Kingdom of Heaven is compared to little children at several other places in the New Testament:

Gospel of Thomas
Another saying referring to small children can be found in the non-canonical Gospel of Thomas. The two passages (Matthew 18:1-6 and the passage in Thomas) are different in tone. However, both start by comparing those who enter the Kingdom of Heaven to children, and then make references to eyes, hands, and feet. In Matthew, Jesus suggests that these offending parts should be "cut off," whereas the passage in Thomas takes a different tone in describing spiritual cleansing and renewal:

From the Gospel of Thomas:

Commentary
Cornelius a Lapide makes the following note in his great commentary:
Christ bids us become like little children. Briefly, and to the point, does St. Hilary of Poitiers sum up their characteristics which ought to be imitated by believers. “They,” he says, “follow their father; they love their mother: they wish no evil to their neighbour; they regard not the care of riches; they are not wont to be insolent, nor to hate, nor to tell lies. They believe what they are told; they regard as true what they hear. Let us return, therefore, to the simplicity of little children, for when we have that, we bear about with us a likeness of the Lord’s humility.”

Friedrich Justus Knecht comments on the phrase “Suffer little children to come unto Me:”
This command was given for all times. Parents, and those who represent them, ought to bring their children to Jesus; they ought to take care that they are, first of all, admitted into the Church by holy Baptism; that they learn to know and love Him by means of a Christian education; and that, as soon as they are capable of receiving it, they are united to Him by Holy Communion, and strengthened in virtue by the imposition of hands and anointing of Confirmation.

See also
Kingdom of heaven (Gospel of Matthew)
Matthew 19
Luke 18

Further reading

References

Sayings of Jesus
Gospel of Matthew
Gospel of Luke
Children